"Shoot the Dog" is a song by British singer-songwriter George Michael, released as the second single from his fifth and final studio album, Patience, though released a year and a half prior to the album. It was his last release for Polydor Records, after which he departed from that label and returned to Sony Music, on which the album Patience, including the song "Shoot the Dog", was released. The song is a protest song referring to (and critical of) British Prime Minister Tony Blair and American President George W. Bush. Released on 29 July 2002, it peaked at number one in Denmark and number 12 in the United Kingdom.

The music video for the song is completely animated. The single marked 20 years since the release of Wham!'s first single, "Wham Rap! (Enjoy What You Do)", another politically charged song written by Michael. "Shoot the Dog" samples the Human League song "Love Action (I Believe in Love)". It also samples the "That's right!" vocal from Silver Convention's "Get Up and Boogie", as well as the "Gotta get up" vocal from Michael's own song, "Fastlove" (1996).

Music video
The music video featured animation provided by the satirical British cartoon series 2DTV. It originally premiered on ITV after the episode "Series 2, Episode 6" on 2 July 2002, and was the number-one music video on rotation on MTV between July and August 2002. Following the death of George Michael on 25 December 2016, the music video was broadcast by MTV Classic in the United States, and ITV in the United Kingdom on 26 December 2016 — ahead of a rerun of the movie Bee Movie — and featured a title card paying tribute to Michael.

Synopsis

The video starts off in the White House, where President George W. Bush is given an explanation about the current state of affairs in the world. Bush (depicted behaving like a naïve child) has not understood a word of it, so a general re-explains everything with the use of a hand puppet. Then the song starts and George Michael enters the White House, leaving the men's toilet (in reference to the scandal of April 1998 where Michael was caught during a lewd act in a toilet). He, Bush and the general start dancing to the music before Michael leaves the scenery. In the next scene, Michael leaves his house (dressed like Homer Simpson) and is bullied by his neighbour and his dog. Back home that night, the neighbour goes on tormenting him by playing loud music, which irritates George Michael and his family members (who are all clones of himself, and are dressed like The Simpsons). Then Michael/Homer chases the dog with a water gun, only to be shot himself. Three drag queen versions of Michael (of which one of them looks like Marge Simpson) start dancing to the music, only to be bothered by Geri Halliwell.

Next, Michael (as himself) walks to the White House lawn where President Bush throws a ball so his dog can fetch it. Prime Minister Tony Blair chases and fetches the ball instead, cuddled by Bush in reward. Michael continues his walk and enters Iraq where he accidentally steps on a missile, launched to England, while Saddam Hussein praises the act. Michael rides the missile (possibly in homage to Major Kong's final scene in Dr. Strangelove), until it crashes in Blair's bedroom where Cherie Blair tries to get his attention, but Blair is only interested in Bush, who suddenly crawls into their bed. In the following scene, three versions of George Michael dance next to each other (all are references to other periods of his musical career). Back on the White House lawn, Blair tries to fetch another ball thrown by Bush, but it changes into a missile (in a reference to the video Californication) which then crashes into the Michael/Simpsons' house. There, Blair watches television with the family. Trevor McDonald announces a world war, but shrugs his shoulders not knowing what to do. Blair changes the channel to the Golden Jubilee, where Elizabeth II and Prince Charles are seen greeting people from the balcony of Buckingham Palace.

Now with a hairstyle similar to Philip Oakey, Michael jumps on the balcony and starts dancing with The Queen and one of her corgis. Prince Charles tries to do the same, but moves completely out of rhythm. Then the Queen's crown falls of her head and lands on Charles'. He is excited, but then is bitten in the behind by the dog. Meanwhile, Michael jumps at two large groups of soldiers. He sticks flowers in their guns (a reference to the famous picture of hippie protesters by Bernie Boston) and then strips to his underwear, before jumping onto Cherie Blair's bed. She quickly changes the television channel, and the scene changes to the 2002 FIFA World Cup, with David Beckham and Paul Scholes playing soccer.

Tony Blair appears in American football attire, and changes the football into an American football before leaving the stadium. Pierluigi Collina gives him a red card, while David Seaman starts crying. While Michael seduces Cherie, Tony Blair uses the United Kingdom as a speedboat to annex his country to the United States. In the final scene, Michael dances in a cowboy outfit, joined by Bush and Blair, before the two politicians leave the scene together. Then other clones of Michael jump in to join him, until they all resemble the Village People. Bush and Blair re-enter the scene dancing the tango together, and the song ends. Back at the White House, President Bush liked the song so much, that he asks his general to repeat everything. The general is not pleased.

Track listings
UK, South African, Australian, and Japanese CD single
 "Shoot the Dog" (explicit album version)
 "Shoot the Dog" (Moogymen mix)
 "Shoot the Dog" (Alexkid Shoot the Radio remix)
 "Shoot the Dog" (video)

UK cassette single
 "Shoot the Dog" (explicit album version)
 "Shoot the Dog" (Moogymen remix)

European and Japanese DVD single
 "Shoot the Dog" – 5:35
 "Freeek!" – 4:33

Charts

Release history

See also
 "Land of Confusion" by Genesis (a protest song that featured caricatures of celebrities and politicians, provided by Spitting Image, in the music video)
 Poodle (insult)
 List of number-one songs of the 2000s (Denmark)

References

2002 singles
2002 songs
Animated music videos
Anti-war songs
British synth-pop songs
Cultural depictions of Charles III
Cultural depictions of David Beckham
Cultural depictions of Elizabeth II
Cultural depictions of George W. Bush
Cultural depictions of Saddam Hussein
Cultural depictions of Tony Blair
Cultural depictions of the Village People
George Michael songs
Number-one singles in Denmark
Polydor Records singles
Protest songs
Song recordings produced by George Michael
Songs about dogs
Songs about prime ministers of the United Kingdom
Songs about George W. Bush
Songs written by George Michael
Songs written by Ian Burden
Songs written by Philip Oakey